The Student Press Initiative (SPI) at Teachers College, Columbia University, is a professional development program for teachers, which uses publication as a tool to teach literacy skills. Publication, or "Going Public," entails everything from publishing professionally bound books of student writing and organizing community-based panel discussions to developing downloadable MP3s and staging theatrical performances. This not-for-profit educational organization partners with schools to transform classrooms into mini-publishing houses that celebrate student voice, activism and achievement. Founded in 2002, SPI provides intensive consultation and curriculum planning resources to classroom teachers in its partner schools, and publishes the culminating student-authored projects.

According to the organization’s website, SPI has partnered with over 60 schools over the past seven years. The goal of the partnerships is to link Teachers College resources with classrooms across the nation. Through these partnerships, SPI provides teachers with the tools and support they need to create projects that culminate in the publication of student-written books and teacher-written curriculum guides. SPI has published student-authored texts written across the disciplines, including math, science, English language Arts, ELL and bilingual studies. Over the years, the organization has hosted public performances of student work at various community venues, including Barnes & Noble and Borders bookstores, the Samsung Experience at the Time Warner Center in Manhattan, and the Rikers Island Correctional Facility.  In 2008, SPI partner teachers received one of four Tribute WTC Visitor Center Annual Teacher Awards for the book Yesterday’s Issues, Today’s Perspectives, Tomorrow’s Lessons written by students from the Academy for Young Writers.

History
The Student Press Initiative is a signature initiative of the Center for Professional Education of Teachers (CPET), a non-profit organization based out of Teachers College, Columbia University. SPI first took root in 2002 in the classroom of founder, Erick Gordon. Before completing his Masters in English Education at Teachers College, Gordon was a fiction writer and the founding editor of Underhouse in San Francisco's independent zine scene in the early 90s. Gordon later carried this spirit of self-publishing into his classroom at the New York City Lab School where he built Bag of Bees Press as a way to further the writing efforts of his students.

Philosophy and tradition
The Student Press Initiative’s philosophy of project-based learning focuses on three key principals: genre study, writing for authentic audience, and community involvement and connection. SPI’s mission is to "...revolutionize education by advancing teacher leadership in reading and writing instruction,” according to its web site.  The organization believes students become experts in a project’s central writing forms through immersion in genre study. Students read mentor texts, break the genre down into its components and, ultimately, craft pieces that represent their learning and culminate in the publication of their original writing.

SPI follows in the footsteps of educators such as James Moffett, Peter Elbow, Ken Macrorie, Eliot Wigginton, and Ruth Vinz, who have long advocated for celebrating student voice and writing with rhetorical purpose. In keeping with this tradition, SPI  believes curriculum-based publications that "grow from highly specified genre studies in the classroom not only democratize students' opportunities to publish, but also provide opportunities to link content-area reading and writing skill development with the excitement of real-world learning."

Past and present partner schools
 Academy for Young Writers
 Beacon High School
 Banana Kelly High School
 Bayard Rustin Educational Complex
 Art and Music Academy
 Math and Science Academy
 Institute for Media and Writing
 International School of Business
 Brooklyn Community Arts & Media High School
 Brooklyn Lab School
 Brooklyn Preparatory High School
 DeWitt Clinton High School
 Excelsior Preparatory High School
 Foundations Academy
 Hempstead High School
 Heritage High School
 Hoboken/A.J. Demerest High School
 Holcombe L Rucker School of Community Research
 Horizon Academy at Rikers Island
 Long Creek Detention Center, ME
 Long Island City High School
 Manhattan Business Academy
 Millennium Art Academy
 New York City Lab School for Collaborative Studies
 Pablo Neruda Academy
 Queens Preparatory High School
 Rose M. Singer Center
 University of Sarajevo, Bosnia

References

Columbia University